Androidland was an Android-themed pop-up store, created by the carrier Telstra in collaboration with Google, on Bourke Street, Melbourne, Australia, in December 2011.

The store is themed heavily in green, featuring several Android "green robot" sculptures. In the store, Telstra provides visitors with an interactive spaceship zone that features a flight simulator (via the Google Earth software, a Liquid Galaxy set-up), also including a massive screen on which visitors can play Angry Birds. It features scented areas with gingerbread and grass aromas, called "Android grass", to further immerse visitors.

History
Androidland had been in development since July 2011. Google Australia helped to train the store's Android experts to be able to assist visitors with their current devices, help them with their new ones and recommend apps to install.

Warwick Bray, the Executive Director of Telstra Mobile, stated, "Over the past 12 months we've seen a huge growth in the number of customers coming in-store and asking us about Android phones and tablets. With Androidland we wanted to create a retail environment like no other that helps us to answer customer questions in a fun, interactive way."

Reception
Logan Booker, writing for Gizmodo Australia wrote "It's a friendly environment, definitely, and if I were to make the switch to Android, I’d be sure to stop by to aid in my decision-making. The interesting fusion of business with an "experience" beyond product demonstrations gives the shop-within-a-shop a corporate Powerhouse Museum feel."

The Telstra press release stated Androidland was a temporary installation but also noted the possibility of the installation to expand through other Telstra stores in Australia based on customer feedback.

References

Android (operating system)
Google real estate
Telstra